Azarovo is the name of several rural localities in Russia.

Modern localities
Azarovo, Bryansk Oblast, a village in Setolovsky Rural Administrative Okrug of Pochepsky District in Bryansk Oblast; 
Azarovo, Maloyaroslavetsky District, Kaluga Oblast, a village in Maloyaroslavetsky District of Kaluga Oblast
Azarovo, Zhukovsky District, Kaluga Oblast, a village in Zhukovsky District of Kaluga Oblast
Azarovo, Kursk Oblast, a village in Azarovsky Selsoviet of Kastorensky District in Kursk Oblast
Azarovo, Oryol Oblast, a village in Voinsky Selsoviet of Mtsensky District in Oryol Oblast
Azarovo, Kardymovsky District, Smolensk Oblast, a village in Molkovskoye Rural Settlement of Kardymovsky District in Smolensk Oblast
Azarovo, Novoduginsky District, Smolensk Oblast, a village in Dneprovskoye Rural Settlement of Novoduginsky District in Smolensk Oblast
Azarovo, Sychyovsky District, Smolensk Oblast, a village in Varaksinskoye Rural Settlement of Sychyovsky District in Smolensk Oblast
Azarovo, Belsky District, Tver Oblast, a village in Demyakhovskoye Rural Settlement of Belsky District in Tver Oblast
Azarovo, Privolzhskoye Rural Settlement, Kimrsky District, Tver Oblast, a village in Privolzhskoye Rural Settlement of Kimrsky District in Tver Oblast
Azarovo, Tsentralnoye Rural Settlement, Kimrsky District, Tver Oblast, a village in Tsentralnoye Rural Settlement of Kimrsky District in Tver Oblast
Azarovo, Rzhevsky District, Tver Oblast, a village in Chertolino Rural Settlement of Rzhevsky District in Tver Oblast

Alternative names
Azarovo, alternative name of Azarova, a village in Boshinsky Rural Administrative Okrug of Karachevsky District in Bryansk Oblast;

See also
Azarov, Russian last name